Samuel Booker McDowell Jr (1928 - 2014) was an American herpetologist who worked on the comparative anatomy of turtles and snakes and studied snakes of Oceania.

He earned a B.Sc. (1947) and a Ph.D. (1957) from Columbia University., and worked at the American Museum of Natural History.

His zoological author abbreviation is McDowell.

The snakes, Morelia mcdowelli NSW Coastal Carpet Python; Hydrophis macdowelli Small-headed Sea Snake; Candoia mcdowelli Bevel-nosed Ground Boa; Tropidonophis mcdowelli New Guinea keelback & Typhlops mcdowelli New Guinea Blind Snake are named in his honour.

Some taxa authored
Acrochordus arafurae
Emydinae
Pseudoxenodontinae
Salomonelaps

Selected publications

References

1928 births
2014 deaths
American herpetologists
Place of birth missing
Place of death missing
Columbia University alumni
People associated with the American Museum of Natural History